Florida Action Committee (FAC) is a non-profit advocacy and support organization for those on sex offender registries and their families based in Florida. Florida Action Committee is state affiliate of National RSOL, and part of the movement to reform sex offender laws in the United States.

See also
Alliance for Constitutional Sex Offense Laws
Reform Sex Offender Laws, Inc.
Advocates For Change
Arkansas Time After Time
California Reform Sex Offender Laws
USA FAIR, Inc.
Illinois Voices for Reform
Michigan Citizens for Justice
Women Against Registry - W.A.R
Adam Walsh Child Protection and Safety Act

References

External links
Floridaactioncommittee.org
Reform Sex Offender Laws, Inc.
Registrants and Families Support Line
FDLE Florida Sexual Offenders and Predators
Dru Sjodin National Sex Offender Public Website

Sex offender registration
Non-profit organizations based in Florida
Civil liberties advocacy groups in the United States